WWP may refer to:

 West Windsor-Plainsboro Regional School District, a New Jersey school district
 Wizards of Waverly Place
 Women Writers Project
 Workers World Party
 World Wrestling Professionals, a South African wrestling promotion
 World Wide Pictures
 Worms World Party
 Wounded Warrior Project, an American veteran's service organization
 World Waterpark, a waterpark at West Edmonton Mall
 North Whale Seaplane Base, airport code WWP